Earl of Anglesey was a title in the Peerage of England during the 17th and 18th centuries.

History
The first creation came in 1623 when Christopher Villiers was created Earl of Anglesey, in Wales, as well as Baron Villiers. He was the elder brother of George Villiers, 1st Duke of Buckingham and the younger brother of John Villiers, 1st Viscount Purbeck. However, the Earldom and Barony became extinct on the death of his son, the second Earl, in 1661, who in 1644 had married the young widow of his cousin William Villiers, 2nd Viscount Grandison, becoming the step-father of her only child, Barbara Villiers.

The second creation came in 1661 when Arthur Annesley, 2nd Viscount Valentia, was created Earl of Anglesey, in Wales, and Baron Annesley, of Newport Pagnel in the County of Buckinghamshire. The titles were deemed extinct in 1761.

The wife of the Earl was normally given the title of Countess.

Earls of Anglesey

First creation (1623)
Christopher Villiers, 1st Earl of Anglesey (d. 1630)
Charles Villiers, 2nd Earl of Anglesey (d. 1661)

Second creation (1661)
Arthur Annesley, 1st Earl of Anglesey (1614–1686)
James Annesley, 2nd Earl of Anglesey (1645–1690)
James Annesley, 3rd Earl of Anglesey (1670–1702)
John Annesley, 4th Earl of Anglesey (died 1710)
Arthur Annesley, 5th Earl of Anglesey (1678–1737)
Richard Annesley, 6th Earl of Anglesey (1690–1761)

All but the last of these, and various other family members, are believed to be buried in the crypt of St Peter's Old Parish Church, Farnborough, Hampshire.

See also 
Duke of Buckingham

References

Extinct earldoms in the Peerage of England

Earl

1623 establishments in England
1661 disestablishments in England
1661 establishments in England
1761 disestablishments in England
Noble titles created in 1623
Noble titles created in 1661